A Small Problem is a British sitcom originally broadcast on BBC2 in 1987. Intended as a satire on prejudice, and starring Christopher Ryan who had previously played Mike in The Young Ones, the show was set in a Britain with a form of apartheid based on people's height. Anyone below 5 ft tall was forced to live in tower-block ghettos south of the River Thames. However, many viewers appeared not to understand the satirical aspect of the show, and the BBC was flooded with complaints.

It was written by comedy writers Tony Millan and Mike Walling. The theme tune was written by Mo Foster and Mike Walling.

See also
 Heightism

External links

1987 British television series debuts
1987 British television series endings
1980s British sitcoms
BBC television sitcoms
English-language television shows
Television shows set in London